Lactuca sibirica, the Siberian lettuce, is a species of wild lettuce native to Norway, Sweden, Finland, the Baltic states, Belarus, Ukraine, all parts of Russia, Kazakhstan, Mongolia, the northern half of China, the Korean peninsula, Sakhalin, the Kuril Islands, and Japan. It is the host of the systemic rust fungi Puccinia minussensis, which propagates with it along its ramets, resulting in complex host-parasite interactions.

References

sibirica
Plants described in 1874